Jorunna spongiosa is a species of sea slug, a dorid nudibranch, a shell-less marine gastropod mollusc in the family Discodorididae.

Distribution
This species was described from Brazil.

Ecology
Prey of Jorunna spongiosa include sponges Haliclona sp., Callyspongia pallida and Callyspongia sp.

References

External links

Discodorididae
Gastropods described in 2013